Eupithecia schnitzleri is a moth in the family Geometridae that is endemic to Thailand.

The forewings are ash grey with a brownish tinge and the hindwings are clear white.

References

Moths described in 2009
Endemic fauna of Thailand
Moths of Asia
schnitzleri